Cambrai Mountain is a summit in Banff National Park on the border between British Columbia and Alberta, Canada.

Cambrai Mountain was named in commemoration of the Battle of Cambrai (1917).

References

Notes

Three-thousanders of Alberta
Three-thousanders of British Columbia
Canadian Rockies
Mountains of Banff National Park